Uromastyx alfredschmidti, commonly known as the ebony mastigure, Schmidt's mastigure, or Schmidt's spiny-tailed lizard, is a species of lizard in the family Agamidae. The species is indigenous to North Africa.

Etymology
The specific name, alfredschmidti, is in honor of German herpetologist Alfred A. Schmidt.

Geographic range
U. alfredschmidti is found in Algeria and Libya.

Habitat
The natural habitats of U. alfredschmidti are subtropical or tropical dry shrubland, rocky areas, and hot deserts.

Conservation status
U. alfredschmidti is threatened by habitat loss.

Diet
Like other species in the genus Uromastyx, U. alfredschmidti is herbivorous.

Reproduction
U. alfredschmidti is oviparous.

Taxonomy
The generic name (Uromastyx) is derived from the Ancient Greek words ourá (οὐρά) meaning "tail" and mastigo (Μαστίχα) meaning "whip" or "scourge", after the thick-spiked tail characteristic of all Uromastyx species.

References

Further reading
Sindaco R, Jeremčenko VK (2008). The Reptiles of the Western Palearctic. 1. Annotated Checklist and Distributional Atlas of the Turtles, Crocodiles, Amphisbaenians and Lizards of Europe, North Africa, Middle East and Central Asia. (Monographs of the Societas Herpetologica Italica). Latina, Italy: Edizioni Belvedere. 580 pp. .
Sindaco R, Wilms TM, Venchi A (2012). "On the distribution of Uromastyx alfredschmidti Wilms & Böhme, 2000 [sic] (Squamata: Agamidae: Uromastycinae)". Acta Herpetologica 7 (1): 23-28.
Tamar K, Metallinou M, Wilms T, Schmitz A, Crochet P-A, Geniez P, Carranza S (2017). "Evolutionary history of spiny-tailed lizards (Agamidae: Uromastyx) from the Saharo-Arabian region". Zoologica Scripta 47 (2): 159-173.
Trape J-F, Trape S, Chirio L (2012). Lézards, crocodiles et tortues d'Afrique occidentale et du Sahara. Paris: IRD Orstom. 503 pp. . (in French).
Wilms T, Böhme W (2001). "Revision der Uromastyx acanthinura - Artengruppe, mit Beschreibung einer neuen Art aus der Zentralsahara (Reptilia: Sauria: Agamidae) [= "Revision of the Uromastyx acanthinura species group, with description of a new species from the Central Sahara (Reptilia: Sauria: Agamidae)]". Zoologische Abhandlungen Staatliches Museum für Tierkunde, Dresden 51 (8): 73-104. (Uromastyx alfredschmidti, new species). (in German, with English abstract).

Uromastyx
Reptiles described in 2001
Taxa named by Thomas Wilms
Taxa named by Wolfgang Böhme (herpetologist)
Taxonomy articles created by Polbot